Jew Valley is a basin in Lake County, Oregon, in the United States. 

Jew Valley was named for a colony of Jewish farmers who settled there in the early 20th century.

References

Jews and Judaism in Oregon
Landforms of Lake County, Oregon
Rural Jewish culture
Valleys of Oregon